The Front de l'Algérie française (French Algerian Front, FAF) was a political and militant movement in favour of French Algeria, established in 1960 in Algiers. Its founder was Said Boualam.

On November 11, 1960, a demonstration called by the Front degenerated into violence. A few weeks later, the Front called for the visit of the president Charles de Gaulle to be violently opposed and for the army to mutiny against the government's orders.

History

Creation of the FAF 
The FAF was established on the 15th of June, 1960 following a meeting between former FNN and ex-UNR held at 73 Alfred Street-Leluch in Algiers. Yvan Santini announced the creation of the FAF at a press conference held the same day or June 17th, according to sources.

Violent Manifestations and Dissolution 

On the 11th of November 1960, a demonstration at the call of the French Algerian Front resulted in a riot in Algiers.

On 8 December following, the movement called for violent opposition to the visit of General de Gaulle and, to the army, to no longer support its policy in Algeria.

Following the riots in Algiers on December 9, the French Algerian Front was banned by the French authorities on 15 December, 1960.

Clandestine activity 
On March 7, 1961, a leaflet claiming a series of attacks perpetrated in Algiers was signed jointly by the FAF and the France-Resurrection network, an organization separate from the  OAS.

Notable personalities of the FAF 
 Saïd Boualam, Vice-President (Deputy  RNUR)

Oranie 
 Yvan Santini, Spokesperson (General Councilor)
 Villeneuve, leader (general councilor)
 Conesa, leader
 Lucien Castelli, Officer (in charge of financial files)

Algerian 
 Antoine Andros, Officer (City Councilor)
 Camille Vignau, director (general councilor)
 Dominique Zatarra, leader
 André Seguin, director (journalist)

Constantine 
 Edme Canat (deputy Unity of the Republic)
 Pierre Portolano (Deputy Unity of the Republic)

See also
Organisation armée secrète (OAS)
Algerian War

References

1960 disestablishments in Algeria
1960 establishments in Algeria
Algerian War
Articles containing video clips
Defunct organisations based in Algeria
Former French colonies
Organizations disestablished in 1960
Organizations established in 1960
Paramilitary organisations based in Algeria
Political organisations based in Algeria
Rebel groups in Algeria
Terrorism in France